HD 26764, also known as HR 1314 or rarely 14 H. Camelopardalis, is a solitary white hued star located in the northern circumpolar constellation Camelopardalis. It has an apparent magnitude of 5.19, making it faintly to the naked eye if viewed under good conditions. At its current distance, HD 26764's brightness is diminished by 0.26 magnitudes due to interstellar dust.

HD 26764 has a stellar classification of either  A2 Vn or A1 Vn. Both classes indicate that the object is an A-type main-sequence star with broad (nebulous) absorption lines due to rapid rotation. At present it has 2.74 times the mass of the Sun and 3.4 times the Sun's radius. At the age of 388 million years, HD 26764 is a rather evolved dwarf star, having completed 91.2% of its main sequence lifetime. An X-ray emission with a luminosity of  has been detected around the star. A-type stars are not expected to produce X-rays, so it must be coming from an unseen companion.

References

A-type main-sequence stars
1314
019949
026764
Camelopardalis (constellation)
Durchmusterung objects